The Mashan Broadcasting and Observation Station is a historical broadcasting station and observation tower in Jinsha Township, Kinmen County, Taiwan.

History
The station used to send out propaganda message to the People's Liberation Army soldiers on Mainland China to surrender and join the Republic of China Armed Forces.

Features
Xiamen can be observed from the station which located 1,800 meters away during low tide and 2,100 meters during high tide.

See also
 List of tourist attractions in Taiwan
 Beishan Broadcasting Wall
 Dadeng Subdistrict

References

Buildings and structures in Kinmen County
Jinsha Township
Observation towers
Propaganda in Taiwan
Tourist attractions in Kinmen County